The 1985–86 Davidson Wildcats men's basketball team represented Davidson College in NCAA men's Division I competition during the 1985–86 NCAA Division I men's basketball season. Lead by head coach Bobby Hussey, the team played its home games at Johnston Gym. The Wildcats finished second during the Southern Conference regular season and won the Southern Conference tournament to receive an automatic bid to the NCAA tournament – the school's first appearance since 1970. Davidson finished win an overall record of 20–11 (10–6 SoCon).

Roster

Schedule and results

|-
!colspan=9 style=| Regular season

|-
!colspan=9 style=| SoCon Tournament

|-
!colspan=9 style=| NCAA Tournament

References

Davidson Wildcats men's basketball seasons
Davidson
Southern Conference men's basketball champion seasons
Davidson Wildcats men's b
Davidson Wildcats men's b
Davidson